Sarah Iversen (born 10 April 1990) is a Danish handball player for Herning-Ikast Håndbold and the Danish national team.

She made her debut on the Danish national team on 19 March 2015, against France.

She represented Denmark at the 2017 World Women's Handball Championship in Germany.

She is the elder sister of handballer Rikke Iversen.

Achievements
Damehåndboldligaen:
Winner: 2017
Silver Medalist: 2019
Danish Cup:
Winner: 2019
EHF Cup:
Semifinalist: 2017, 2019

Individual awards  
 All-Star Line player of Damehåndboldligaen: 2017/18

References

External links

1990 births
Living people
Sportspeople from Frederiksberg
Danish female handball players